Tabulaephorus djebeli is a moth of the family Pterophoridae. It is found in Fars Province in southern Iran.

The wingspan is about 25 mm. The forewings are creamy white.

References

Moths described in 1981
Pterophorini